Maggie Hall (December 26, 1853 January 17, 1888) was a prostitute and brothel madam in the early history of Murray, Idaho, originally from Dublin, Ireland. In local lore she is known as a "Prostitute with a heart of gold" and the "Patron Saint of Murray".

Biography
Maggie Hall was born in Darwin, Lancashire, England, to an Irish father and mother, both of whom were well educated. They ensured their daughter was also well educated. She could recite Shakespeare, Dante and John Milton.

The Hall family were tailors and Thomas Hall took his family to Manchester to grow his business. Unfortunately, his investments failed and he fell into debt. Maggie's sister, Mary, Bridget and Louisa would have to find work or marry. Mollie she sailed for America to seek her fortune. She arrived in New York City in 1870, according to the census taken in New York Harbor. Here Once there, she started working as a barmaid. Soon, she met a wealthy young man named Berdan and agreed to marry. Hall wanted a Catholic marriage, but Berdan wanted to marry immediately. He woke a city official who promptly married them. Berdan thought Maggie too common a name for the wife of a man in his position, so she changed her name to Mollie. Mollie was a popular woman's name in  the 1870's. The marriage was kept a secret from Berdan's father who would not approve and gave his son a generous monthly allowance. The father eventually found out and cut Berdan off.

Prostitution
Without any income, and now in debt, Berdan tried to talk his wife into prostitution. She eventually, and reluctantly, agreed. Feeling guilt for her actions, she went to receive the Confession,but instead of receiving forgiveness, she was excommunicated from the Catholic Church. This section needs revision. Mollie received the sacrament of baptism at her birth. Tithing is also a sacrament. She tithed to the Catholic church all of her life and gave to protestant churches as well. 

With her husband making more demands on her, and her love for him fading, in around 1877, Hall left her husband to work solely for her own rewards. She travelled to Chicago, Virginia City, Nevada, San Francisco and Portland, Oregon, increasing her charges as she went. At one stage she was reputed to be the mistress of a millionaire, this is true, Mr. Charles Burchard came to Mollie's aid after a fire in her apartment. Burchard owned the building and did, in fact, provide her with a new wardrobe. They began a May/ December romance. During this time she built up an expensive wardrobe as Mr. Burchard was generous. He bought Mollie a trotting race horse named Maggie and a racehorse for himself named BG Burchard. Burchard was working on building the pedestal for the statue of Liberty in New York Harbor and Mollie was privy to the models and sculptures as they were developed.

Murray
In 1884, after hearing about the gold strikes in the Coeur d'Alene Mountains, she headed to Idaho. While heading there on a train, she met Calamity Jane, although their paths diverged at Thompson Falls, Montana.

Hall brought a horse and joined a pack train heading to Murray, Idaho. On the way, the train encountered a blizzard while in Thompson Pass. She noticed a woman and child struggling in the snow, so took them and found shelter for the night while the train carried on its journey. When they arrived in Murray the day after the train, word of her actions had spread and she was admired by the townsfolk. This story is apocryphal. My 3rd great grandfather saw the newspaper with the story of a Christmas tale in the Lewiston Teller newspaper. 

In Murray, Hall met a man named Philip O'Rourke and the two became longtime friends. O'Rourke helped her to find a cabin in Paradise Row where she set up a brothel. Hall gained the nickname Molly B'Damn in Murray. In some accounts, this originated from O'Rourke mishearing her when she told him her name; Molly Berdan (her married name). In other accounts, she gained the nickname from her colorful language.

On miner's payday, Hall would fill a bathtub with water in the alley behind the brothel and invite miners to throw gold dust in it. When enough had been thrown in, she would strip off and bathe in the tub. For extra gold dust, the miners could help wash her.

Hall was known for her kindness and charity. She would house the homeless, feed the hungry and nurse the sick. Murray and Eagle city had more than a dozen competent physicians and druggists. Murray was never affected by smallpox  Mollie was caring for patients sick with Typhus and TB. She nursed sick patients and succumbed to the disease.

Death

Hall contracted tuberculosis in October 1887 and died on January 27, 1888, aged 34. O'Rourke was at her bedside. The community pulled all their curtains shut and the bars, gambling dens and surrounding mines shut down for her funeral. The service was given by a Methodist minister as the Catholic priest refused. At her own request she was buried as Maggie Hall in Murray Cemetery. Her tombstone erroneously gives her age as 35.

Legacy 
Hall's legendary compassion led the citizens of Murray to name their annual city celebration the "Molly B'Damn Gold Rush Days" in her honor. They have trouble casting the role of Molly B'Damn as there are no known photographs of her. The Sprag Pole Museum located in Murray features a reconstruction of her bedroom as one of the exhibits.

References

Sources
 
 
 
 
 

1853 births
1888 deaths
American prostitutes
Irish female prostitutes
19th-century deaths from tuberculosis
People from Shoshone County, Idaho
Tuberculosis deaths in Idaho